Eldorado Township, population 1,873, is one of eleven townships in Montgomery County, North Carolina, United States.

Geography
Eldorado Township is drained by the Uwharrie River and Yadkin River, which together form the Pee Dee River.  Tributaries to the Uwharrie River in Eldorado Township include Gold Mine Branch, Moccasin Creek, Horsepen Creek, and Crow Creek.  Tributaries to the Yadkin River include Beaverdam Creek, Glady Fork, Stillhouse Run, Garr Creek, Reynolds Creek, Alls Fork, Reeves Spring Branch, and Dutch John Creek.

References

Townships in Montgomery County, North Carolina
Townships in North Carolina